Iridostoma is a genus of moths of the family Yponomeutidae.

Species
Iridostoma catatella - Viette, 1956 
Iridostoma diana - Bradley, 1957 
Iridostoma ichthyopa - Meyrick, 1909 

Yponomeutidae